ISIA - Istituto Superiore per le Industrie Artistiche (Higher Institute for Artistic Industries), is the name of four Italian universities, which train students in the field of design. The ISIAs are in Rome, Florence, Faenza and Urbino. They are public institutions under the umbrella of the Italian Ministry of Education, University and Research, AFAM (Artistic and Musical Higher Education, Italian: Alta Formazione Artistica e Musicale) division.

The Institutions

Rome
Rome ISIA is Italy's oldest institution in the field of industrial design. It was founded in 1965 as Industrial Design and Visual Communication Course for architects and engineers, and changed its name in 1973. It follows the European tradition of the Bauhaus and the Hochschule für Gestaltung of Ulm, grafting their methodologies onto Italian creative culture.
Rome ISIA has received many prizes and acknowledgements, and is the only European institution to have won the Compasso D'Oro by Associazione per il Disegno Industriale ADI (Industrial Design Association) twice (1979 and 1987).
Rome ISIA is a member of the Cumulus, the International Association of Universities and Colleges of Art, Media and Design.

Rome ISIA offers a three-year undergraduate program leading to a Bachelor of Arts in Industrial Design (180 ECTS-credits), a two-year Master's program in Systems Design (120 ECTS-credits), and a two-year Doctor of Philosophy in Interaction Design. Thirty new students are admitted to the BA and MA programs each year.

Subsidiaries
Rome ISIA has two subsidiaries, in Pescara (since 2009) and Pordenone (since 2011). Both of them offer a Bachelor of Arts in Industrial Design.

Florence
Florence ISIA was founded in 1975 is a member of the Cumulus as well.

Florence ISIA offers a three-year undergraduate program leading to a Bachelor of Arts in Industrial Design, and two two-year Master's programs: an MA in Product Design and an MA in Communication Design.

Faenza
Faenza ISIA was founded in 1980. The structure of its course was formerly different from the other ISIAs as the experimentation was mainly focused on ceramic products. By the end of the 1990s, its attention moved towards product design in general.

Faenza ISIA offers a three-year undergraduate program leading to a Bachelor of Arts in Product Design and Design with Advanced Ceramic Materials, and two two-year Master's programs: an MA in Product Design and Design with Advanced Materials and an MA in Communication Design.

Urbino
Urbino ISIA was founded in 1974 and trains students in the field of graphic and editorial design.

Urbino ISIA offers a three-year undergraduate program leading to a Bachelor of Arts in Graphic Design and Visual Communication, and three two-year Master's programs: an MA in Communication, Design and Publishing and an MA in Illustration and an MA in Photography.

References

External links 
 ISIA Faenza
 ISIA Firenze
 ISIA Roma
 ISIA Urbino
Ministero dell'Università e della Ricerca, AFAM division

Design schools in Italy
Istituto Superiore per le Industrie Artistiche
1965 establishments in Italy
Educational institutions established in 1965